Beta-taxilin is a protein that in humans is encoded by the TXLNB gene.

Interactions 

TXLNB has been shown to interact with STX4.

References

Further reading